The Standing Council of the Baronetage is a United Kingdom organisation which deals with the affairs of baronets. It was first established in January 1898 as the Honourable Society of the Baronetage. In July 1903 it was reconstituted as a permanent organisation under the name of the Standing Council of the Baronetage.

Its roles include publishing the Official Roll of the Baronetage, providing advice to those wishing to prove their succession to a baronetage, to provide an environment for social interaction between members of the society and to make contributions to charitable good causes. Membership of the organisation is restricted to baronets and their heirs apparent. In order to be recognised by the society as a baronet an individual's name must be entered on the Official Roll of the Baronetage.

External links
 http://www.baronetage.org - Official website of the Standing Council of the Baronetage